The Bolivia national handball team is the national handball team of Bolivia.

Tournaments record

South and Central American Championship

South American Games

Bolivarian Games

IHF South and Central American Emerging Nations Championship

References

External links
IHF profile

Men's national handball teams
National sports teams of Bolivia